The London Borough of Bromley is the southeasternmost of the London boroughs that make up Greater London, bordering the ceremonial county of Kent, which most of Bromley was part of before 1965. The borough's population is an estimated 332,336. It is named after Bromley, its principal town; other major towns are Penge, Hayes, West Wickham, Chislehurst, Beckenham and Orpington. The local authority is Bromley London Borough Council.

Geography
The borough is the largest in Greater London by area and occupies . The majority of the borough is Metropolitan Green Belt, including nearly all of the land south of the A232-A21 route between West Wickham and Pratt's Bottom. Consequently, it is also perhaps the most rural borough and contains more of the North Downs than any other, as that escarpment is broad between Bromley and Banstead. This is also reflected in its population density, which is the lowest of the 32 London boroughs.

Most of the population lives in the north and west of the borough, with an outlier at Biggin Hill in the far south. The borough shares borders with the London Boroughs of Lewisham and Greenwich to the north, Bexley to the north-east, Southwark and Lambeth to the north-west, and Croydon to the west. It also borders the Sevenoaks District of Kent to the east and south, and the Tandridge District of Surrey to the south-west.

Westerham Heights, the highest point in London and Kent at an altitude of 804 feet (245 m), is on the southern boundary. The Prime Meridian passes through Bromley.

About 30% of the land in Bromley is farmland, the highest figure of a London Borough.

History
The borough was formed on 1 April 1965 by the London Government Act 1963. It covered the areas of the Municipal Borough of Bromley, the Municipal Borough of Beckenham, Penge Urban District, Orpington Urban District and the Chislehurst part of Chislehurst and Sidcup Urban District. The local government authorities that until then had administered those other areas were simultaneously abolished by the London Government Act on 1 April 1965.
In 1969, after a local campaign, local government responsibility for the village of Knockholt was transferred to the neighbouring Sevenoaks Rural District: before 1965, it had been part of the Orpington Urban District.

Districts

The borough is partly urban and partly rural, the former to the north and very much part of the built-up area of suburban London.

The principal parts of the northern section, from west to east, are Beckenham, which includes Eden Park and Elmers End; Bromley with Bickley, Bromley Park and Bromley Common, Park Langley, Plaistow, Shortlands and Southborough; Chislehurst, with Elmstead and Sundridge. The built-up area around Orpington not only encompasses its direct outskirts of Chelsfield, Crofton, Derry Downs, Goddington, Kevingtown, and Petts Wood; it also includes the erstwhile separate settlements of Farnborough, Green Street Green, Pratt's Bottom, St Mary Cray and St Paul's Cray. Other smaller suburban areas include Penge, Anerley, and parts of nearby Crystal Palace including its park. In addition, parts of Mottingham, Sydenham, Swanley and Ruxley lie within the borough boundaries.

There are two main built-up areas in the southern part of the borough: Hayes and West Wickham. Biggin Hill, Downe and Keston with Leaves Green and Nash are separate, smaller, rural settlements.

Local attractions include Down House (the home of Charles Darwin), Chislehurst Caves, Holwood House (the home of William Pitt the Younger), Crofton Roman Villa, and the site of The Crystal Palace.

Governance

Bromley is divided into 22 wards with a total of 58 council seats. These are currently represented by:
 Conservative: 36
 Labour: 12
 Liberal Democrats: 5
 Chislehurst Matters: 3
 Independents: 2

Bromley was under Conservative control from its creation until the local elections of 7 May 1998 when a Liberal Democrat/Labour coalition assumed power. After a number of by-elections and a defection, the Conservatives regained control on 5 July 2001.

The 22 wards are shown on the accompanying map. Ward names often straddle the named settlements and suburban areas above: their boundaries are fixed, whereas the latter are not.

Demographics

In 1801, the civil parishes that form the modern borough had a total population of 8,944. This rose slowly throughout the nineteenth century, as the district became built up; reaching 17,192 in the middle of the century. When the railways arrived, the rate of population growth increased. The population peaked in the 1970s, when industry began to relocate from London.

In the 2011 UK Census, the borough had a population of 309,392. All major religions are represented, but of those stating a choice, 60.07% described themselves as Christian. In 2001, of the population, 43.47% were in full-time employment and 11.06% in part-time employment – compared to a London average of 42.64% and 8.62%, respectively. Residents were predominantly owner-occupiers, with 32.53% owning their house outright, and a further 42.73% owning with a mortgage. Only 1.42% were in local authority housing, with a further 12.74% renting from a housing association, or other registered social landlord.

A study in 2017 showed that Bromley had the second lowest poverty rate (15%) of any London borough.

The following table shows the ethnic group of respondents in the 2001 and 2011 census in Bromley.

Ethnicity

Religion

The following shows the religious identity of residents residing in Bromley according to the 2001, 2011 and the 2021 censuses.

Education

Transport
Bromley is one of only six London Boroughs not to have at least one London Underground station within its boundaries. However, the borough has many railway stations served by London Overground, Thameslink, Southeastern and Southern. The borough also has several stops on the Tramlink network.

Stations operated by London Overground (all are also served by Southern):
Anerley
Crystal Palace 
Penge West

National Rail stations:
Birkbeck
Beckenham Junction
Shortlands
Bromley North
Bromley South
St Mary Cray
Sundridge Park
Ravensbourne
Bickley
Elmstead Woods
Chislehurst
Petts Wood
Orpington
Chelsfield
Knockholt
Kent House
Penge East
Lower Sydenham (Shared with Lewisham)
New Beckenham
Clock House
Elmers End
Eden Park
West Wickham
Hayes

Tramlink stops:
Beckenham Junction
Beckenham Road
Avenue Road
Birkbeck
Elmers End

In March 2011, the main forms of transport that residents used to travel to work were: driving a car or van, 27.4% of all residents aged 16–74; train, 5.1%; bus, minibus or coach, 5.1%; on foot, 4.3%; work mainly at or from home, 4.0%; underground, metro, light rail, tram, 2.3%; passenger in a car or van, 1.5%.

Sport, leisure and culture
The Borough has several sporting clubs:
Bromley F.C. a Non-League football club
Cray Wanderers F.C. a Non-League football club
Orpington F.C. a Non-League football club
Holmesdale F.C. a Non-League football club
Greenwich Borough F.C. a Non-League football club
Beckenham Town F.C. a Non-League football club
Club Langley FC a Non-League football club

The borough is also home to an extensive libraries service, containing 14 branches, currently operated by Greenwich Leisure Limited under their trademark Better on behalf of Bromley council.

The Beckenham Comedy Cabaret, a monthly comedy cabaret event, hosted and run by Jody Kamali, has been running in the heart of Beckenham since 2015, usually on the last Friday evening of the month.

The Bromley Times and Bromley News Shopper publish local news in the borough.

London Fire Brigade
London Fire Brigade has four fire stations within the London Borough of Bromley. The borough is the largest in the city: about 150 km2. With just one pumping appliance, Orpington has one of the largest areas to cover in London, measuring 46.7 km2. In 2006/2007, Orpington attended 1,308 incidents. There is also a high volume pump at the station. Beckenham, Bromley and Biggin Hill cover the rest of the borough with four pumping appliances and a hose layer.

In 2006/2007 just under 4000 incidents were attended in the borough. Noticeably, compared to 2005/2006 there was an 11% decrease in special service calls (road traffic collisions, chemical incidents, flooding etc.).

Twin towns
Bromley is twinned with:
 Neuwied, Rhineland-Palatinate, Germany.

Notable residents
The locations a number of notable residents over the years have been lived have been recognised with  blue plaques these residents include:

 Alexander Muirhead – electrical engineer specialising in wireless telegraphy (1848–1920)
 Benjamin Waterhouse Hawkins – sculptor and natural history artist (1807–1889)
 Brass Crosby (1725–1793)
 Charles Keeping (1924–1988)
 David Bowie (1947–2016)
 Doctor John Fry (1922–1994)
 Enid Blyton – author (1897–1968)
 Ewan MacColl – political songwriter and playwright (1915–1989)
 Frank Bourne – soldier (1855–1945)
 Harold Bride – wireless operator aboard RMS Titanic (1890–1956)
 Heddle Nash – opera singer (1895–1961)
 H. G. Wells – author (1866–1946)
 Ira Aldridge – actor (1807–1867)
 John Pennington Harman VC – Soldier (1914–1944)
 Joseph Paxton – English gardener, architect and Member of Parliament
 Little Tich (Harry Relph) – 4-foot-6-inch-tall (137 cm) English music hall comedian and dancer (1867–1928)
 Lord Ted Willis – playwright and author (1918–1992)
 Prince Pyotr (Peter) Alekseyevich Kropotkin (1842–1921)
 Rachel and Margaret McMillan
 Richmal Crompton – author (1890–1969)
 Sir Geraint Evans(1922–1992)
 Sir John Lubbock, the First Lord Avebury (1834–1913)
 Sir Malcolm Campbell – world land and water speed record holder (1885–1948)
 Sir Victor Shepheard (1893–1989)
 Thomas Crapper – plumber (1837–1910)
 W. G. Grace – cricket player (1848–1915)
 Walter de la Mare – short story writer, and novelist (1873–1956)
 William Pitt, 1st Earl of Chatham (1708–1778)
 William Willett (1856–1915)

See also

Bromley parks and open spaces
List of churches in the London Borough of Bromley

References
References

Notes

External links
Summary of formation of the Borough, including its constituent parts
London Borough of Bromley council website
London Borough of Bromley Museum
Council for Voluntary Service for the London Borough of Bromley
Directory of local services 
Images of Bromley
Bromley Neighbourhood Watch Association website (BromleyNWA.org.uk)

 
Bromley
1965 establishments in the United Kingdom